Brian Fitzpatrick (born November 18, 1945 in Assiniboia, Saskatchewan) is a Canadian politician.

After serving as a board of education trustee in Nipawin, Saskatchewan, Fitzpatrick ran in the 2000 Canadian federal election for the Canadian Alliance. He was elected to the House of Commons of Canada, and, after the Canadian Alliance merged into the Conservative Party of Canada, he ran again and won. In both elections, he ran in the riding of Prince Albert. Fitzpatrick also ran in the 1993 Canadian federal election for the Reform Party of Canada in the riding of Mackenzie but he lost. He is a lawyer and the former opposition critic of Litigation, Rural Development, Regional Development and New and Emerging Markets. He was one of the founding members of the Saskatchewan Party and was its first director of policy development and chaired the founding convention for the party.
In 2006 Brian Fitzpatrick sponsored the Act to Ammend Income Tax, and on June 22, 2007 the bill was passed.

References

External links
How'd They Vote?: Brian Fitzpatrick's voting history and quotes
 

1945 births
Living people
Politicians from Prince Albert, Saskatchewan
People from Assiniboia, Saskatchewan
Reform Party of Canada candidates in the 1993 Canadian federal election
Conservative Party of Canada MPs
Members of the House of Commons of Canada from Saskatchewan
21st-century Canadian politicians